The Doubletree by Hilton, formerly known as The Crowne Plaza and before that, the Sheraton Billings Hotel, is a high-rise located in the Downtown Business District of Billings, Montana, United States. It is the second-tallest building in the northern Rocky Mountain region and was the tallest from 1980 - 1985 until the completion of the First Interstate Center, also in Billings. Construction started on the building in 1979 and was completed in 1980; it rises  in height. It is used primarily for hotel space, and is the tallest hotel building in Montana.

The Doubletree is unusual among high-rises in that it is built almost entirely of bricks in an applied masonry facade; the structure contains  2,372,982 red clay bricks that were formed in an 1869 kiln. Upon its completion in 1980, the building was declared the tallest load-bearing brick structure in the world by the Brick Institute of America.
The building has twenty two above ground floors with a fine dining restaurant on the twentieth floor. It is connected to a seven level city parking garage and the historic grand building via sky bridges. In 2016, the name changed from ″Crowne Plaza″ to ″Doubletree by Hilton.″

See also
 First Interstate Center
 List of tallest buildings in Billings
 List of tallest buildings by U.S. state

References

Buildings and structures in Billings, Montana
Hotels in Montana
Crowne Plaza hotels
1980 establishments in Montana
Buildings and structures completed in 1980
Hotel buildings completed in 1980